Black Pearl is the second studio album by American rapper Yo-Yo. It was released on June 23, 1992, through EastWest Records America/Atlantic. Production was handled by DJ Pooh, Sir Jinx, Down Low Productions, DJ Muggs, Rashad Coes and DJ Bobcat, with Ice Cube serving as executive producer. The album peaked at number 145 on the Billboard 200 and number 32 on the Top R&B/Hip-Hop Albums.

The album spawned two singles: "Black Pearl" and "Home Girl Don't Play Dat". "Black Pearl" reached number 11 on the Hot Rap Singles chart and number 74 on the Hot R&B/Hip-Hop Singles & Tracks chart, and "Home Girl Don't Play Dat" peaked at number 3 on the Hot Rap Singles chart and number 53 on the Hot R&B/Hip-Hop Singles & Tracks chart. The song "I Can't Take No More" was included in the Girls Town soundtrack.

Critical reception

AllMusic's Ron Wynn wrote that: "Yo-Yo's positive (but not simplistic or naive) messages regarding female sexuality, self-esteem and achievement were grounded in hard raps and thudding beats on this album, still her most complete, and effective production." Robert Christgau commented that "the nervous propulsion and unreleased tension of her funk agitates mind-body-spirit, only to be put right by a voice that's gotten kinder without even thinking about going soft. Advising the downpressed or dissing fools, her lyrics are smarter throughout and stunning on one that makes a battered wife's bizness its own."

Track listing

Sample credits
Track 2 contains a sample from "Joy" by Isaac Hayes from the 1973 album Joy
Track 3 contains a sample of "Be Alright" by Zapp
Track 6 contains a sample of "Scratch My Back" by Otis Redding from the 1966 album The Soul Album and "Disco Queen" by Hot Chocolate from the album Cicero Park
Track 8 contains a sample of "Strawberry Letter 23" by The Brothers Johnson from the 1977 album Right on Time
Track 9 contains a sample of "Humpin'" by the Bar-Kays from the album Best of the Bar-Kays
Track 10 contains a sample of "Voices Inside (Everything Is Everything)" by Donny Hathaway from the 1972 album Live
Track 11 contains a sample of "Hey Jerome" by Bo Diddley from the 1972 album Where It All Began
Track 12 contains a sample of "Walk From Regio's" by Isaac Hayes from the 1971 album Shaft

Personnel

 Yolanda M. Whitaker – main artist
 Shawn McLemore – background vocals (track 3)
 Frederick Lee Drakeford – featured artist (track 4)
 Marsha McClurkin – additional background vocals (track 4)
 Kymberli Armstrong – background vocals (tracks: 10, 12)
 Joyce Tolbert – background vocals (tracks: 10, 12)
 DeMonica Santiago – background vocals (track 10)
 Shireen Crutchfield – background vocals (track 10)
 Craig A. Miller – background vocals (track 11)
 Torrence Woods – background vocals (track 12)
 Joseph "DJ Wildstyle" Mann – scratches (track 5)
 Mark Jordan – drum programming (track 7), recording engineer (track 3), producer (tracks: 2, 3, 8, 9, 11)
 David Foreman – guitar & bass guitar (tracks: 7, 10, 12)
 Jason White – keyboards (tracks: 7, 10, 12)
 James Perry – bass guitar (track 10)
 Bob Morris – recording engineer (tracks: 2, 11)
 Down Low Productions – mixing & producer (tracks: 4, 5)
 Prince Charles Alexander – recording engineer (tracks: 4, 5)
 Mike Green – recording engineer (track 6)
 Jason Roberts – engineering (track 6)
 Bob Drake – engineering (tracks: 7, 10, 12)
 Darryl Dobson – recording engineer (tracks: 8, 9)
 Lawrence Muggerud – producer (track 6)
 Anthony Wheaton – producer (tracks: 7, 10, 12)
 Bobby Ervin – producer (track 8)
 James Rashad Coes – producer (track 8)
 O'Shea Jackson – executive producer
 Carlton Batts – mastering
 David Provost – photography

Charts

References

External links

1992 albums
Yo-Yo (rapper) albums
East West Records albums
Albums produced by DJ Pooh
Albums produced by DJ Muggs